Iranian Korean or Korean Iranian may refer to:
 Iran–North Korea relations
 Iran–South Korea relations
 Koreans in Iran
 Iranians in North Korea
 Iranians in South Korea
 Multiracial people of mixed Iranian and Korean descent

See also 
 Digging to America, a 2006 novel by American author Anne Tyler, which tells the story of an Iranian American couple and a so-called White Anglo-Saxon Protestant (WASP) couple, each of whom adopts a girl from Korea